Grenmar is a part of Telemark county of Norway. The region consists of the communities of Kragerø and Drangedal.

Vestfold og Telemark